Cameron Wadenges, (born 5 August 2000) is a New Caledonian footballer who plays as a defender for New Caledonian club AS Magenta and the New Caledonian national team.

Private life
Cameron is the son of well known Caledonian former footballer Georges Wadenges, who played at the same position as Cameron, was the captain of the national team and played in his career for AS Magenta, AS Mont-Dore and Gaïtcha FCN

Club career
Wadenges started his career in the youth of Magenta. In 2017 he moved to the first team and made his debut. In 2019 he played with the club in the 2019 OFC Champions League.

International career
In 2017 Wadenges was part of the U-17 team that qualified for the 2017 FIFA U-17 World Cup for the first time in India. Wadenges played all three games, including a historious draw against Japan.
In 2018 Wadenges was called up by Thierry Sardo for the New Caledonia national football team to play a friendly against Vanuatu national football team. He made his debut on November 17, 2018, in a 2–2 draw against Vanuatu where he played 45 minutes before being replaced by Kiam Wanesse.

References

New Caledonian footballers
Association football defenders
New Caledonia international footballers
Living people
2000 births